Leonard Beaumont (4 January 1915 – 22 July 2002) was a professional footballer, who played for Huddersfield Town, Portsmouth and Nottingham Forest. He was born in Huddersfield, West Yorkshire.

References

Obituary in Wisden's Cricket Almanack
Peterborough United record

1915 births
2002 deaths
Footballers from Huddersfield
English footballers
Association football midfielders
English Football League players
Huddersfield Town A.F.C. players
Portsmouth F.C. players
Peterborough United F.C. players